Tutani Million Makaringe is a South African politician who has represented the African National Congress (ANC) in the Mpumalanga Provincial Legislature since 2019. He was elected to his seat in the 2019 general election, ranked 22nd on the ANC's party list. As of May 2022, he was the Deputy Chief Whip in the legislature.

Makaringe was born in Kumani, a village in Bushbuckridge in present-day Mpumalanga province. He was formerly a local councillor in Bushbuckridge Local Municipality, where he was the ANC's Chief Whip in the council by 2017.

References

External links 
 

Living people
Year of birth missing (living people)
Members of the Mpumalanga Provincial Legislature
African National Congress politicians
21st-century South African politicians
People from Bushbuckridge